is a professional Japanese baseball player. He plays infielder for the Tokyo Yakult Swallows.

External links

 NPB.com

1987 births
Living people
Japanese baseball players
Nippon Professional Baseball first basemen
Nippon Professional Baseball left fielders
Nippon Professional Baseball shortstops
Nippon Professional Baseball third basemen
Baseball people from Toyama Prefecture
Tokyo Yakult Swallows players